John Donohue may refer to:

John "Chickie" Donohue, American former marine
John J. Donohue III, American law professor and economist
John P. Donohue, American surgeon and urologist
John W. Donohue, American architect